The 2019 Sibiu Open was a professional tennis tournament played on clay courts. It was the eighth edition of the tournament which was part of the 2019 ATP Challenger Tour. It took place in Sibiu, Romania between 16 and 22 September 2019.

Singles main-draw entrants

Seeds

 1 Rankings are as of 9 September 2019.

Other entrants
The following players received wildcards into the singles main draw:
  Adrian Bodmer
  Victor Vlad Cornea
  Michał Dembek
  Mircea-Alexandru Jecan
  Filip Cristian Jianu

The following players received entry into the singles main draw as alternates:
  Pavel Nejedlý
  Petr Nouza
  Fabien Reboul

The following players received entry from the qualifying draw:
  Jaroslav Pospíšil
  Matej Sabanov

The following player received entry as a lucky loser:
  Sergio Martos Gornés

Champions

Singles

 Danilo Petrović def.  Christopher O'Connell 6–4, 6–2.

Doubles

 Sadio Doumbia /  Fabien Reboul def.  Ivan Sabanov /  Matej Sabanov 6–4, 3–6, [10–7].

References

2019 ATP Challenger Tour
2019
2019 in Romanian tennis
September 2019 sports events in Europe